Elio Catola (born 19 November 1935 in Uliveto Terme, Pisa) was an Italian athlete who mainly competed in the 400 metre hurdles.

Biography
He won two medals, at senior level, at the International athletics competitions. He has 7 caps in national team from 1959 to 1962.

Olympic results

See also
 Italy national relay team

References

External links
 

1935 births
Italian male hurdlers
Athletes (track and field) at the 1960 Summer Olympics
Olympic athletes of Italy
Universiade medalists in athletics (track and field)
Living people
Universiade silver medalists for Italy
Universiade bronze medalists for Italy
Medalists at the 1959 Summer Universiade
Medalists at the 1961 Summer Universiade